Locality in astronomy is in theory closeness of the observer relative to the observed astronomical phenomenon under consideration, and thus in practice the relative closeness of the phenomenon to the star system of the Sun.

Being local is an ambiguous condition, and always relative to the order of magnitude of the relevant phenomenon. The term "local" is commonly applied to structures on five successively larger scales beyond the roughly two-light-years diameter of the Solar System: 
 The Local Interstellar Cloud containing the Solar System, roughly 30 light years across
 The Local Bubble of gas in turn containing it, 300 light years or more across
 The Local Arm, a.k.a. the Orion Arm (of the Milky Way galaxy), 3,500 light years wide, and approximately 10,000 long

 The Local Group, the group of galaxies that contains the Milky Way, 10 million light-years across
 The Local Supercluster or Virgo Supercluster, 110 million light-years across